The 1967–68 Duleep Trophy was the seventh season of the Duleep Trophy, a first-class cricket tournament contested by five zonal teams of India: Central Zone, East Zone, North Zone, South Zone and West Zone.

South Zone won the final against West Zone on first innings lead.

Results

Final

References

External links
Series home at CricketArchive

Duleep Trophy seasons
Duleep Trophy
Duleep Trophy